Rozhdestvenskaya Khava is a rural locality (a selo) in Novousmansky District of Voronezh Oblast, Russia, located on the right bank of the Khava River  from Voronezh. Population: over 2,000 (2002 est.).

History
Founded in the first decade of the 18th century, it was named for a nativity church on the Khava River. In the 19th century the village was the center of Rozhdestvenskaya volost, Voronezhsky Uyezd, Voronezh Governorate. In 1859, it had 2,787 inhabitants living in 248 households.

Facilities
There is a middle school, a music school, a library, a house of culture, a church, a bank, a hospital, a village council, a post office, a sawmill, and several grocery stores in Rozhdestnevskaya Khava.

References

External links
 Unofficial website of Rozhdestvenskaya Khava

Rural localities in Novousmansky District
Voronezhsky Uyezd